The Ténéré (Tuareg: Tenere, literally: "desert") is a desert region in south central Sahara. The Ténéré's boundaries are said to be the Aïr Mountains in the west, the Hoggar Mountains in the north, the Djado Plateau in the northeast, the Tibesti Mountains in the east, and the basin of Lake Chad in the south. It is the locus of the Neolithic Tenerian culture.

Name
The name Ténéré comes from the Tuareg language, meaning "desert", in much the same way that the Arabic word for "desert", Sahara, came to be applied to the region as a whole.

Climate
The Ténéré has a hot desert climate (Köppen climate classification BWh), typical of the large Sahara Desert. The climate is hyper-arid, extremely hot, sunny and dry year-round and there is virtually no plant life. The average high temperatures are above 40 °C (104 °F) for about 5 months and more in the hottest regions, and record high temperatures as high as 50 °C (122 °F) are highly possible during summer. The annual average high temperature is around 35 °C (95 °F) and even more. During "winter" months, the average high temperatures stay above 25 °C (77 °F) and generally hover around 30 °C (86 °F).

The annual precipitation amount is extremely low—one of the lowest annual rainfall amounts found on Earth—around 10 mm (0.39 in) to 15 mm (0.59 in), and frequently several years may pass without seeing any rainfall at all. Water is notoriously difficult to find, even underground, and wells may be hundreds of miles apart.

The sunshine duration is also one of the highest results on the planet at around 4,000 hours, that is about 91% of the daylight hours between sunrise and sunset. This part of the Sahara Desert has one of the harshest climates in the world. According to a NASA study, the sunniest spot in the world would be a ruined fort in Agadem in the southeastern Ténéré, and has even clearer skies than the polar deserts overall.  The Ténéré, as well as the rest of the Great Desert, are amongst the most extreme environments on Earth.

Topography

Most of the Ténéré is a flat basin, once the bed of the prehistoric Lake Chad. In the north, the Ténéré is a vast sand sheet - the true, featureless 'Ténéré' of legend reaching up to the low hills of the Tassili du Hoggar along the Algerian border. In the centre, the Bilma Erg forms rows of easily navigable low dunes whose corridors make regular byways for the azalai or salt caravans. To the west, the Aïr Mountains rise up. To the southeast, the Ténéré is bordered by the Kaouar cliffs running 100 km north to south. At the base, lies a string of oases including the famous Bilma. Periodic outcrops, such as the unusual marble Blue Mountains in the northwest near Adrar Chiriet, or the Agram hills near the oasis of Fachi and Adrar Madet to the north, are rare but notable landmarks.

History
During the Carboniferous period, the region was beneath the sea; later it was a tropical forest. A major dinosaur cemetery lies southeast of Agadez at Gadoufaoua; many fossils have been found there, having eroded out from the ground. An almost complete specimen of the crocodile-like reptile Sarcosuchus imperator, nicknamed the SuperCroc, was discovered there by paleontologists.

During early human history, this was a fertile land much more congenial to human life than it is now. The region was inhabited by modern humans as long ago as the Paleolithic period some 60,000 years ago. They hunted wild animals and left evidence of their presence in the form of stone tools including tiny, finely carved arrow heads. During the Neolithic period about 10,000 years ago, ancient hunters, the early Holocene Kiffian people, created rock engravings and cave paintings that can still be found across the region.

The Neolithic Subpluvial was an extended meteorological period, from about 7,500-7,000 BC to about 3,500-3,000 BC, of relatively wet and rainy conditions in the climate history of northern Africa. It was both preceded and followed by much drier periods. Several archaeological sites that date from this time, often identified as part of the Tenerian culture, are dotted across the deserts along the borders of Niger, Algeria and Libya. The human population dwindled as the Sahara dried out, and by 2500 BC, it had largely become as dry as it is today.

In recent times, Ténéré has been a crossing route for African migrants looking to immigrate to Europe.

Population

The Ténéré is very sparsely populated. Fachi and Bilma are the only settlements that are not on the edge of the Tenéré.

While the well-known Tuareg occupy the Aïr Mountains and Agadez to the west, and still operate the salt caravans for Hausa merchants, other inhabitants of the Ténéré, found from oases like Fachi eastwards, are the non-Berber Kanuri and Toubou, the latter thought to be descended from among the original inhabitants of the Sahara.

Governance
In 1960, the Tuareg territory became part of the independent republic of Niger. It has been divided into seven départments. The central part of the Ténéré is a protected area, under the auspices of the Aïr and Ténéré Natural Reserve.

Cities
The administrative centre of the Ténéré is the town of Agadez, south of the Aïr Mountains and west of the Tenere. There are also various oasis settlements, some like Bilma and Séguedine based on salt production.

Settlements and villages of Ténéré:

Fachi

Bilma
Dirkou

Séguedine

Landmarks

The desert is also known for the celebrated Tree of Ténéré, once thought to be among the most remote in the world.  Situated by the last well before entering the Grand Erg du Bilma on the way to Fachi, salt caravans relied on the tree as a landmark until it was allegedly knocked down by a truck driver in 1973.

It was replaced by a metal sculpture and the remains are enshrined at the museum in Niamey (capital of Niger). New trees were planted but, because of the very low water table (the adjacent well is some 40m deep), irregular watering by passing travellers saw them fail to survive. Despite this unfortunate mishap, the tree is still often indicated on maps of the region as a notable landmark, as is the less well-known Arbre Perdu (Lost Tree) situated in the true Tenere to the north, west of Chirfa.

A monument to UTA Flight 772, a 200-foot diameter circle of dark stones and 170 broken mirrors which represent each victim of the 1989 terrorist attack which brought down the aircraft, was built in May and June 2007 at 16°51′53″N 11°57′13″E.

View

See also
Aïr and Ténéré National Nature Reserve
Germa
Green Sahara
The Ténéré motorbike
Missions Berliet-Ténéré

References

 Samuel Decalo. Historical Dictionary of Niger.  Scarecrow Press, London and New Jersey (1979). 
 Jolijn Geels. Niger. Bradt London and Globe Pequot New York (2006). .
 Chris Scott. Sahara Overland. Trailblazer (2004). .

Natural regions of Africa
Deserts of Niger
Ergs of Africa
Tuareg
World Heritage Sites in Niger